Gittes monologer (Gitte's Monologues) is a collection of poems by the Danish poet Per Højholt. Originally published in 1984, these satirical and political poems are construed as Gitte's monologues, addressed to her friend Susanne.

References

External links 
  Højholt recites some of Gitte's monologues (1)
  Højholt recites some of Gitte's monologues (2)
  Højholt recites some of Gitte's monologues (3)
  Højholt recites some of Gitte's monologues (4)
  Højholt recites some of Gitte's monologues (5)
  Højholt recites some of Gitte's monologues (6)

Danish poetry